Richard Pérez  (born 23 September 1973 in San Carlos) is a Uruguayan football midfielder He currently plays for Victoria in Liga Nacional de Honduras.

Club career
Pérez previously played for Centro Atlético Fénix, Deportivo Maldonado and Defensor Sporting in the Primera División Uruguaya.

Statistics

References

1973 births
Living people
People from San Carlos, Uruguay
Uruguayan footballers
Centro Atlético Fénix players
Deportivo Maldonado players
Atenas de San Carlos players
Defensor Sporting players
C.D.S. Vida players
Atlético Olanchano players
C.D. Victoria players
Liga Nacional de Fútbol Profesional de Honduras players
Expatriate footballers in Honduras

Association football midfielders
Uruguayan expatriate footballers
Uruguayan expatriate sportspeople in Honduras